Francés de Corteta, also known as Corteta de Prades (in French François de Cortète and Cortète de Prades; Agen, 1586 – Hautefage, September 3, 1667) was a nobleman from the Agen province and an Occitan-language poet and baroque play writer.

Biography 
François de Cortète was born to a noble family, his father, Jean-Jacques de Cortète, was governor of Castelculier. He studied in Agen and served in Adrien de Montluc's army. In 1608, he married Jeanne de Caumont and in 1614 he retired in Agen where he wrote his plays, which remained unpublished until his death. One of his sons published them for the first time.

Playwright 
He is the author of three comedies in Occitan:
 Ramonet, o Lo paisan agenés, tornat de la guerra which deals with the topos of the gascon miles gloriosus.
 Miramonda, a pastoral comedy.
 Sancho Pança, al palais dels Ducs a play based on Don Quixote's Dukes episode.

Bibliography 
Cortète's editions:
 Ratier, Charles. Œuvres de François de Cortète. Agen: Imprimerie Moderne, 1915. Corteta's works on Archive.org
Critics:
 Garavina, Fausta. La letteratura occitanica moderna. Bologna: Sansoni, 1970.
 Gardy, Philippe. Histoire et anthologie de la littérature occitane, Tome II, l'âge du baroque – 1520 -1789. Montpellier: Presse du languedoc, 1997.
Anatole, Cristian – Lafont, Robert. Nouvelle histoire de la littérature occitane. Paris: P.U.F., 1970.

External links 
 Cortète's work at Archive.org

Occitan-language writers
17th century in France
Occitan poets
17th-century French poets
French male poets
17th-century French male writers